The Flemish Hunting Deck, also known as the Cloisters set of fifty-two playing cards and Hofjaren Jachtpakket (in Dutch), is a set of fifty-two playing cards owned by the Metropolitan Museum of Art, New York, United States. It is significant in that it is the only complete set of ordinary playing cards from the fifteenth century. Estimate ranges of manufacture are between 1470 and 1480.

The cards are hand-drawn and painted on pasteboard, with highlights of gold and silver, in the contemporary technique for illuminated manuscripts. Printed playing cards had already appeared, by the Master of the Playing Cards and others.

Object
The set of cards is a complete regular set of playing cards, consisting of four suits with a king, queen, jack and ten pip cards. The suits are based on hunting items, consisting of game nooses, hound tethers, horns, and dog collars. It is the only complete set of ordinary playing cards from the fifteenth century. The shown figures display fashion of the era, with short jackets, shortly cut hair and pointy shoes.

The set was most likely made in the Southern Netherlands and Flanders specifically. The set was most likely manufactured between 1470 and 1480. Research on the paper determined that it was made in or before 1450. The first of the two present watermarks originates in France and eastern Flanders and was used between circa 1464 and 1480. The second watermark was used in southern Flanders and the northern Lowlands between circa 1468 and 1479.

The cards are in very good condition, indicating they were used very little or not at all.

History
The set of cards was up for auction at Hôtel Drouot in Paris, France, on 12 December 1978. In the auction catalogue it was mentioned as an incomplete set of tarot cards dating from the sixteenth century. Harrie Kenter, a Dutch antiques dealer from Amsterdam paid 8,000 Dutch guilder for it, believing it to be an older object.

Kenter kept the set for some years, even cycling with it in his coat pocket through Amsterdam, which his insurance company later prohibited him from doing. Kenter determined it was best to auction off the set after only being able to show the set to others at a secure location at a bank. On 6 December 1983, the set of cards was sold at Sotheby's in London for U.S.$143,000. Kenter was transported to the auction house under a police escort. The Metropolitan Museum of Art bought the set of cards and it is now part of The Cloisters collection.

Facsimiles 
In 1995, Piatnik in conjunction with the Metropolitan Museum of Art produced a facsimile of the Flemish hunting pack as a boxed set with a booklet where they were known as the Flämisches Jagdkartenspiel.

See also
Ambraser Hofjagdspiel, another 15th-century hunting deck
Stuttgarter Kartenspiel, another 15th-century hunting deck

References

External links
 Set of Fifty-Two Playing Cards on the Metropolitan Museum of Art website
 Flemish Hunting Deck at World of Playing Cards
 Flemish Hunting Deck at cards.old.no

Manuscripts of the Metropolitan Museum of Art
History of card decks
1470s works
15th-century prints